
Gmina Kamieniec is a rural gmina (administrative district) in Grodzisk Wielkopolski County, Greater Poland Voivodeship, in west-central Poland.

Villages
Gmina Kamieniec contains the villages and settlements of Cykówiec, Cykówko, Cykowo, Doły, Goździchowo, Jaskółki, Kamieniec, Karczewo, Konojad, Kotusz, Kowalewo, Łęki Małe, Łęki Wielkie, Lubiechowo, Maksymilianowo, Parzęczewo, Plastowo, Płastowo, Puszczykówiec, Puszczykowo, Sepno, Szczepowice, Ujazd, Ujazd-Huby, Wąbiewo, Wilanowo and Wolkowo.

Neighbouring gminas
Gmina Kamieniec is bordered by the gminas of Granowo, Grodzisk Wielkopolski, Kościan, Rakoniewice, Śmigiel, Stęszew and Wielichowo.

References

External links
Polish official population figures 2006

Kamieniec
Grodzisk Wielkopolski County